Löcknitz-Penkun is an Amt in the district of Vorpommern-Greifswald, in Mecklenburg-Vorpommern, Germany. The seat of the Amt is in Löcknitz.

The Amt Löcknitz-Penkun consists of the following municipalities:

References

Ämter in Mecklenburg-Western Pomerania